WI or wi may refer to:

Places
 West Indies postal abbreviation
 Wiesbaden, a city in southwest Germany
 Wisconsin, US (postal abbreviation)

People and characters
 Wi (mythology), a Lakota deity
 Wi Man of Gojoseon, a military leader from the Han dynasty state of Yan, in modern Korea

Businesses and organizations
 West Indies cricket team, in cricket statistics
 Women's Institutes, a locally organised group for women in various countries including Britain and Canada

Other uses
 Wi (hangul), a Korean character
 Waterfall ice, the ice formed from a frozen waterfall; see

See also

 
 
 Wii, Nintendo's fifth home video game  console
 W1 (disambiguation)
 WL (disambiguation)
 Wiwi (disambiguation)